Maarakeh is a town in Tyre District, in Lebanon.

Geography
The Municipality of Maarakeh is located in the Kaza of Tyre (sour) one of Mohafazah of South Lebanon kazas (districts). Mohafazah of South Lebanon is one of the eight mohafazats (governorates) of Lebanon. It is 90 kilometers (55.9 mi) away from Beyrouth (Beirut) the capital of Lebanon. Its elevation is 270 meters (1) (886 ft - 295 yd) above sea level. Maarakeh surface stretches for 2000 hectares (20 km² - 7.7 mi²)(2).

Name
E. H. Palmer wrote that the name Mảrakeh meant "The battle field".

History
In 1596, it was named as a village, al-Ma'raka, in the Ottoman nahiya (subdistrict) of Tibnin under the liwa' (district) of Safad, with a population of 119 households and 3 bachelors, all Muslim. The villagers paid a fixed tax rate of 25% on agricultural products, such as wheat, barley, olive trees, fruit trees, cotton, goats and beehives, in addition to occasional revenues; a total of 13,350 akçe.

In 1875 Victor Guérin found that it had 700 Metawileh inhabitants. He further noted: "Here are uprights and lintels of door with cut stones, apparently ancient; and in a small mosque, built of regular blocks probably taken from an old church, are several fragments of monolithic columns.'"

In 1881, the PEF's Survey of Western Palestine (SWP) described it as: "A village, built of stone, containing about 400 Metawileh, on flat top of high ground, surrounded by gardens, olives, figs, palms, and arable land. There is a spring and five cisterns."

On 28 June 1984 the Israeli army surrounded the town and began house to house searches. 119 men, aged between 13 and 60, were taken away as prisoners for further interrogation. At the time it was estimated that Maarakeh had a population of 13,000.

On 4 March 1985, during the Israeli occupation of Southern Lebanon, an explosion destroyed a mosque killing local resistance leader, Mohammed Saad. At least 15 people were killed in the explosion.

Education

Notable people

 Kassem El Zein (born 1990), Lebanese footballer

References

Bibliography

External links
Survey of Western Palestine, Map 2:  IAA, Wikimedia commons
 Localliban: Centre de resource sur le developpement local:  www.localiban.org

Populated places in the Israeli security zone 1985–2000
Populated places in Tyre District
Shia Muslim communities in Lebanon